A Naval Review is an event where select vessels and assets of the United States Navy are paraded to be reviewed by the President of the United States or the Secretary of the Navy. Due to the geographic distance separating the modern U.S. Navy and the deployment rotations of a various ships within a fleet, it would be exceedingly difficult to imagine a situation where even an entire numbered fleet could be presented at one event, to say nothing of the physical cost and logistical requirements to support over 460 ships exceeding 3.4 million tons displacement.

A naval review can also include warships and delegates from other national navies. The largest modern maritime exercise regularly being conducted by the US Navy is the Rim of the Pacific Exercise (RIMPAC), held biennially during the summer on even-numbered years off the coast of Hawaii. It typically sees the participation of around 50 ships and 200 aircraft, from 2 dozen nations with some 25,000 personnel, culminating in a massive naval review often attended by the Secretary of the Navy, joining the Commander, U.S. Indo-Pacific Command, Commander, U.S. Pacific Fleet, and other invited dignitaries.

Following is a list of select past Naval Reviews, by President. Each was reviewed by the President, unless otherwise noted.

Nineteenth century

Grover Cleveland 
 Apr to June 1893, at Hampton Roads – International Naval Review, part of the Columbian Exposition – President on board the despatch vessel , with the following other U.S. naval vessels present:

Before World War One

Theodore Roosevelt 
 1903 at Oyster Bay, New York – Presidential Fleet Review
 2–4 September 1906, Oyster Bay, New York – U.S. naval vessels included:
 
 
 
 10 June 1907 – Presidential Review, from Fort Monroe as part of Jamestown Exposition which laid the groundwork for Naval Station, Norfolk – U.S. naval vessels included USS Georgia, from which 11 June was proclaimed "Georgia Day"
 16 December 1907, Hampton Roads – Send-off for the Great White Fleet, which included , 15 other battleships, a torpedo boat squadron and transports, USS Truxtun
6–8 May 1908, San Francisco Bay, reviewed by Secretary of the Navy, which included the following units of the Pacific Fleet:
 
 USS Georgia
 
 	
 22 February 1909, Hampton Roads – Return of the Great White Fleet, which included the following vessels:

William Howard Taft 
 2 November 1910 – Before departure for France	
 early November	1911, New York – U.S. naval vessels included:
 
 USS Washington
 1 April 1912, off Yonkers, New York, which included USS Wisconsin		
 14 October 1912, North River –  and  passed before the President and the Secretary of the Navy George von L. Meyer
10–15 October 1912, Philadelphia –

1914–1919: Woodrow Wilson

 May 1915, New York Harbor – inc. 
 September 1919, San Francisco, including  (during which she was visited by Secretary of the Navy Josephus Daniels on 4 September) and 
 12 September 1919, Seattle, Washington – U.S. naval vessels included USS Seattle
late December 1919, North River – Victory Naval Review – U.S. naval vessels included

Inter-war

Warren G. Harding 
 28 April 1921, Hampton Roads – Reviewed by President Warren G. Harding, which included the following U.S. naval vessels:
 USS Delaware
 
 April 1921, Norfolk, Virginia, which included the following U.S. naval vessels:
 
 
 1923, Seattle, Washington, which included  and

Calvin Coolidge 

June 1927, Hampton Roads – Naval vessels included:
 USS Seattle

Franklin D. Roosevelt 

 31 May 1934, New York Harbor, which included the following U.S. naval vessels:
 
 
 
 
September–November 1935, San Diego, California which included the following U.S. naval vessels:
 
 
 USS Concord
 12–14 July 1938, San Francisco, California –  carried President Roosevelt and also included USS Concord.

1940 to 1945

Navy Day, 27 October 1940

Harry S. Truman 
Navy Day Fleet Review in New York Harbor, 27 October 1945

Post-war to present

Dwight Eisenhower 

11–13 June 1957, Hampton Roads – International Naval Review on 350th anniversary of founding of Jamestown, Virginia, which involved 113 ships from seventeen nations, including the French anti-aircraft cruiser  and the following U.S. naval vessels:
 
 
  – Secretary of Defense Charles E. Wilson embarked
 
 
 
  – Flagship for Admiral Jerauld Wright, Commander-in-Chief U.S. Atlantic Fleet and Supreme Allied Commander Atlantic
 
 
 
 
 
 
 

26 June 1959, USS Lake St. Louis reviewed by the President and by Queen Elizabeth II, which included USS Forrest Royal and

Gerald Ford 
1976 - New York Harbor – Fourth International Naval Review in honor of the United States Bicentennial. 
Set to coincide with Op Sail 1976, which included  as host ship on whose flight deck on 4 July the President rang in the Bicentennial.

American ships were joined with vessels from the United Kingdom, Canada, Australia, France, Italy, West Germany, Norway, Sweden, Spain, Portugal, the Soviet Union, Israel, Egypt, Venezuela, Peru, Argentina, Chile, Colombia, South Africa, The Netherlands, & Romania.

Ronald Reagan 
1986 - On July 3–4, the Fifth International Naval Review commemorating the rededication of the Statue of Liberty was held in New York Harbor. Repeating the model from 1776, the warships came in on July 3 and anchored along the channel and the Tall Ships sailed up the Hudson River to the George Washington Bridge past , where Reagan and other VIPs gathered to review the fleet.

Bill Clinton 
3–9 July 2000, New York City – Sixth International Naval Review, set to coincide with Op Sail 200, included the following U.S naval vessels:

Reviewing Ships
  (Clinton's flagship) 
 USS John F. Kennedy
 
 

Parading Vessels

RIMPAC

First held in 1971, RIMPAC is the world's largest international maritime warfare exercise. Hosted and administered by the United States Navy's Indo-Pacific Command in conjunction with the Marine Corps, the Coast Guard, and Hawaii National Guard. It is described by the US Navy as a unique training opportunity that helps participants foster and sustain the cooperative relationships that are critical to ensuring the safety of sea lanes and security on the world's oceans.

Although the 2020 RIMPAC exercise was curtailed due to the COVID-19 pandemic, 25,000 naval personnel and 52 ships and submarines from 26 countries participated in the 2018 exercises, with forces representing Australia, Brazil, Brunei, Canada, Chile, Colombia, France, Germany, India, Indonesia, Israel, Japan, Malaysia, Mexico, Netherlands, New Zealand, Peru, the Republic of Korea, the Republic of the Philippines, Singapore, Sri Lanka, Thailand, Tonga, the United Kingdom, the United States, and Vietnam.

References

External links

 

United States Navy